Help a Reporter Out (HARO) is an online service for journalists to obtain feedback from the public. It enables journalists to connect with experts in issues relevant to their reporting. It was founded as a Facebook group in 2008 by Peter Shankman and was later turned into a mailing list claiming over 800,000 sources and 55,000 journalists and bloggers. In June 2010, HARO was acquired by Vocus, Inc. In 2014, Vocus merged with Cision Inc. and HARO is now one of Cision's brands.

Help A Reporter Out gives users free and paid packages. The free package is where a user receives the HARO daily email and responds to reporters that have questions up and vice versa. HARO provides journalists with a database of sources for upcoming stories.

References

External links

Online journalism
Online companies of the United States
2010 mergers and acquisitions
Internet properties established in 2008